Iligos or Ilingos is a 1963 Greek black and white drama film directed and written by Giannis Dalianidis.  It stars Zoi Laskari and Alekos Alexandrakis.

Plot
Elli (Zoi Laskari) leaves home for a reason that the absolutist father (Alekos Alexandros) approached romantically.  They started a rashly life.

Cast

Zoi Laskari ..... Elli Kapralou
Alekos Alexandrakis ..... Nikos
Voula Zouboulaki ..... Kaiti Kapralou
Phaedon Georgitsis ..... Kostas Panagiotopoulos
Alekos Tzanetakos ..... Fotis
Lefteris Vournas ..... Giorgos
Ilya Livykou ..... Olga Panagiotopoulou
Katerina Helmi ..... Litsa
Malena Anoussaki ..... Giorgos's mother
Angelos Mavropoulos ..... Panagiotis Panagiotopoulos

See also
List of Greek films

External links

1963 films
1963 drama films
Greek drama films
1960s Greek-language films
Films directed by Giannis Dalianidis